Manilkara nicholsonii is a species of plant in the family Sapotaceae. It is endemic to South Africa (Natal), and is threatened by habitat loss.

References

Endangered plants
Fruits originating in Africa
Flora of South Africa
nicholsonii
Plants described in 1982
Taxonomy articles created by Polbot